Ian Roberts may refer to:

Entertainment
 Ian Roberts (American actor) (born 1965), American actor and comedian
 Ian Roberts (South African actor) (born 1952), South African actor, playwright and singer
 Kwame Kwei-Armah (born 1967), British actor, playwright, singer and broadcaster

Others
 Ian Roberts (rugby league) (born 1965), Australian actor and rugby league player known for being the first openly gay rugby league player
 Ian Roberts (Australian footballer) (born 1957), former Australian rules footballer
 Ian Roberts (footballer, born 1961), Welsh association footballer
 Ian Roberts (equestrian) (born 1958), Canadian equestrian events Olympian
 Ian Roberts (linguist) (born 1957), Professor of Linguistics at the University of Cambridge
 Ian Roberts (athlete) (born 1973), Guyanese middle-distance runner
 Ian Roberts (cricketer) (born 1948), English cricketer
 Ian Roberts (painter) (born 1952), Australian bird and native vegetation painter